The PFF National Men's Under-23 Championship (known as the PFF-Suzuki U-23 National Cup for sponsorship reasons) is a football tournament in the Philippines organized by the Philippine Football Federation (PFF) sponsored Japanese automaker Suzuki.

The tournament was announced after the two bodies agreed on a P3.2 million sponsorship deal for the national tournament.

Seasons
2011
2013

References

Defunct football competitions in the Philippines
Recurring sporting events established in 2011
Recurring sporting events disestablished in 2013
2011 establishments in the Philippines
2013 disestablishments in the Philippines